Vagn Eichner Hovard (14 July 1914 – 6 September 1998) was a Danish field hockey player who competed in the 1936 Summer Olympics and in the 1948 Summer Olympics. He was born in Frederiksberg.

In 1936 he was a member of the Danish team which was eliminated in the group stage of the Olympic tournament. He played one match as halfback. Twelve years later he was eliminated with the Danish team in the first round of the 1948 Olympic tournament. He played one match as halfback.

External links
 
Vagn Hovard's profile at Sports Reference.com

1914 births
1998 deaths
Danish male field hockey players
Olympic field hockey players of Denmark
Field hockey players at the 1936 Summer Olympics
Field hockey players at the 1948 Summer Olympics
Sportspeople from Frederiksberg